Jonathan Campbell may refer to:

 Jonathan Campbell (theologian) (born 1964), professor of religion
 Jonathan Campbell (soccer) (born 1993), American soccer player
 Jonathan A. Campbell (born 1947), American herpetologist

See also 
 Jon Campbell, Scottish singer and producer
 John Campbell (disambiguation)